This List of titles and honours of the Portuguese Crown sets out the many titles of the monarchs of the Kingdom of Portugal while the monarchy was still in place.

Titles held by the monarch of Kingdom of Portugal 
Note: Titles marked with * are titles that were no longer used or held at the time of the deposition of the monarchy in Portugal in 1910. Titles marked with " are titles that were personally held by the Portuguese monarch:

Kingdoms 
  King of the United Kingdom of Portugal, Brazil, and the Algarves*
  King of Portugal
  King of the Algarves	
  King of Silves*

Principalities 
  Prince of the Portuguese*

Duchies 
  Duke of Portugal*

Counties 
  Count of Portugal*

Lordships 
  Lord of Ceuta*
  Lord of Alcácer in Africa*
  Lord of Guinea

Titles held by the heir apparent of the Kingdom of Portugal 
Note: Titles marked with * are titles that were not still used or still held at the time of the deposition of the monarchy in Portugal in 1910.

Principalities 
  Prince of Portugal*
  Prince of Brazil*
   Prince Royal of the United Kingdom of Portugal, Brazil, and the Algarves*
  Prince Royal of Portugal and the Algarves

Duchies 
  Duke of Braganza
  Duke of Guimarães

Marquessates 
  Marquis of Vila Viçosa

Counties 
  Count of Guimarães
  Count of Arraiolos
  Count of Ourém
  Count of Neiva
  Count of Faria

Hereditary Orders 
  Grand Master of the Order of the Immaculate Conception of Vila Viçosa
  Grand Master of the Order of Saint Michael of the Wing
  Grand Mistress of the Order of Saint Isabel

Titles held by the heir apparent to the heir apparent of the Kingdom of Portugal

Principalities 
  Prince of Beira

Duchies 
  Duke of Barcelos

Counties 
  Count of Barcelos

See also 
Style of the Portuguese sovereign
Kingdom of Portugal
Portuguese empire
Portuguese nobility

Sources
Titles held by the heir to the throne of Portugal (In Portuguese)
Titles held by the heir to the heir of the throne of Portugal (In Portuguese)

References 

Portuguese monarchy
Portuguese nobility
Portuguese monarchs
Princes of Portugal